Niptinus is a genus of spider beetles in the family Ptinidae. There are at least two described species in Niptinus.

Species
These two species belong to the genus Niptinus:
 Niptinus ovipennis Fall, 1905
 Niptinus unilineatus (Pic, 1900)

References

Further reading

 
 
 
 

Bostrichoidea
Articles created by Qbugbot